Damba Island is an island near the northern shore of Lake Victoria. It is part of the Mukono District of Uganda. The island is about 40 kilometres long and belongs to the Koome group of islands.

References 

Mukono District
Lake islands of Uganda
Islands of Lake Victoria